Martin Nilsson (born 1969) is a Swedish social democratic politician, member of the Riksdag 1992–2006.

References

Members of the Riksdag from the Social Democrats
Living people
1969 births
Members of the Riksdag 2002–2006